Jeannetta Margaret Blackie (19 June 1864 – 4 May 1955) was a New Zealand governess, teacher and church administrator. She was born in London, London, England on 19 June 1864.

References

1864 births
1955 deaths
New Zealand educators
English emigrants to New Zealand